Arowana & Co is a B Corporation certified group with operating companies and investments globally, including in electric vehicles, renewable energy, vocational and professional education, technology and software, venture capital and impact asset management.

The company has offices in London, Tel Aviv, Singapore, Manila, Brisbane, and Sydney.

Arowana & Co. takes its name from the  Arowana fish.

History 
Founded in 2007 by CEO Kevin Chin, Arowana initially operated as a Sydney based specialist fund manager focussed on Australasian investments. Since then, Arowana’s strategy and model has evolved, and today it is a global enterprise that directly owns and operates listed and unlisted enterprises, as well as having investments in specific sectors around the world.

B Corp certification 
Arowana is a certified B Corporation, having achieved full accreditation from the global non-profit organisation B Lab in April 2018.

Companies 
The group currently comprises the following companies:

VivoPower International PLC 

Nasdaq listed VivoPower International PLC.

Tembo e-LV

Edventure Group

Alicorn Global Ventures

AWN Holdings Limited

Arowana Funds Management

Arowana Impact Capital

References 

Australian companies established in 2007
Companies listed on the Australian Securities Exchange
B Lab-certified corporations
Companies based in Melbourne